Dirk Heun (born 4 January 1953) is a German former footballer who played as a midfielder.

Heun made ten appearances for Tennis Borussia Berlin during the 1976–77 Bundesliga campaign.

His son, Dustin Heun, is also a former professional footballer.

References

External links 
 

1953 births
Living people
German footballers
Association football midfielders
Bundesliga players
2. Bundesliga players
Rot-Weiß Oberhausen players
Tennis Borussia Berlin players